Greenhill is a suburb of Adelaide located about  east of the city centre in the foothills of the Adelaide Hills. Its boundaries were created in October 2001 in respect of the "long established name" with some land being moved into the adjoining suburb of Waterfall Gully in July 2002. The suburb includes Greenhill Recreation Park and the western slopes of Mount Lofty. Greenhill Creek flows through Waterfall Gully and feeds into First Creek.

References

Suburbs of Adelaide